Chignecto is a community in the Canadian province of Nova Scotia, located in  Cumberland County on the Isthmus of Chignecto.

References
 Chignecto on Destination Nova Scotia

Communities in Cumberland County, Nova Scotia
General Service Areas in Nova Scotia